James Madison Gregg (June 26, 1806 – June 16, 1869) was an American lawyer and politician who served one term as a U.S. Representative from Indiana from 1857 to 1859.

Biography
Born in Patrick County, Virginia, Gregg attended the public schools and later studied law.
He was admitted to the bar in 1830 and began practice in Danville, Indiana soon thereafter. 
County surveyor of Hendricks County 1834–1837.
He served as clerk of the circuit court from 1837 to 1845.

Congress 
Gregg was elected as a Democrat to the Thirty-fifth Congress (March 4, 1857 – March 3, 1859).
He was an unsuccessful candidate for reelection in 1858 to the Thirty-sixth Congress.

Later career and death 
He resumed the practice of law in Danville, Indiana.
He served as member of the State house of representatives in 1862.

He died in Danville, Indiana, on June 16, 1869.
He was interred in South Cemetery.

References

1806 births
1869 deaths
Democratic Party members of the United States House of Representatives from Indiana
Democratic Party members of the Indiana House of Representatives
People from Danville, Indiana
People from Patrick County, Virginia
19th-century American politicians